Oroha may refer to:
Oroha people, a Melanesian people of the Solomon Islands
Oroha language, the language of the Oroha people